Glyphina is a genus of aphids belonging to the family Aphididae.

The genus was first described by Carl Ludwig Koch in 1856.

The species of this genus are found in Europe and Northern America.

Species:
 Glyphina betulae
 Glyphina schrankiana

References

Aphididae